Malagiella is a genus of spiders in the family Oonopidae. It was first described in 2011 by Ubick & Griswold. , it contains 10 species, all from Madagascar.

Species

Malagiella comprises the following species:
Malagiella ambalavo Ubick & Griswold, 2011
Malagiella andringitra Ubick & Griswold, 2011
Malagiella fisheri Ubick & Griswold, 2011
Malagiella goodmani Ubick & Griswold, 2011
Malagiella nikina Ubick & Griswold, 2011
Malagiella ranavalona Ubick & Griswold, 2011
Malagiella ranomafana Ubick & Griswold, 2011
Malagiella toliara Ubick & Griswold, 2011
Malagiella valterova Ubick & Griswold, 2011
Malagiella vohiparara Ubick & Griswold, 2011

References

Oonopidae
Araneomorphae genera
Spiders of Madagascar